Little Miss Atlanta is an American reality television series which aired on TLC in 2016. A spin-off of Toddlers and Tiaras, it profiles contestants in the Little Miss Black US Pageant system, based in Atlanta, Georgia. Each episode features three young African-American girls and their mothers as they compete in one of the system's pageants.

Episodes

References

External links

2016 American television series debuts
2010s American reality television series
TLC (TV network) original programming
English-language television shows
Television shows set in Atlanta
Television series about beauty pageants
Television series about children
Child beauty pageants
2016 American television series endings
American television spin-offs
Reality television spin-offs